Part of the Weekend Never Dies is a rockumentary film depicting the worldwide concert tour of the Belgian band Soulwax.

Director Saam Farahmand filmed Soulwax on their recent international tour dates, showcasing the events and experiences of the band during the tour. Soulwax filmed 120 shows with one camera in Europe, Japan, the US, Latin America and Australia. This resulted in 2 films: a live music film and a documentary which includes 2manydj’s and Soulwax Nite Versions, and features James Murphy, Nancy Whang, Erol Alkan, Tiga, Boys Noize, Justice, Busy P, So-Me, Peaches, The Naked Guy, Kitsuné, Klaxons in behind the scenes footage, interviews and music.

The DVD also includes a CD recording of "Live At Fabric", and is available in a hardbook DVD case and in a traditional CD case.

DVD
 Part Of The Weekend Never Dies
 Part Of The Weekend REALLY Never Dies
 Commentary (by Tiga)

DVD song credits

CD track listing: Nite Versions Live At Fabric
 Teachers
 Move My Body
 Miserable Girl
 E-Talking
 Accidents And Compliments
 Another Excuse
 I Love Techno
 KracK
 Slowdance
 Washing Up
 NY Excuse

Information
 Format: Box set, PAL
 Language: English
 Subtitles: German, English, Dutch, French
 Region: All Regions
 Aspect Ratio: 1.77:1
 Number of discs: 2
 Classification: Exempt
 Studio: PIAS Recordings, UK

References

External links
 Official Website
 Film trailer
 Soulwax on MySpace

Documentary films about electronic music and musicians
2008 films
Soulwax albums